Andrew Lamb may refer to:

 Andrew Lamb (bishop) ( 1565–1634), Scottish bishop
 Andrew Lamb (cricketer) (born 1978), New Zealand cricketer
 Andrew Lamb (engineer), British engineer
 Andrew Lamb (musician) (born 1958), jazz musician
 Andrew Lamb (writer) (born 1942), British writer on musical theatre and light music
 Andy Lamb (born 1973), American politician from Wisconsin
 Lamb's House, an historic house in Leith, Scotland, built by Andrew Lamb